Woven & Spun is the third studio album by CCM artist Nichole Nordeman, released in 2002.

Critical reception

Woven & Spun received generally positive reception from five music critics. At Christianity Today, Russ Breimeier writing that lyrically the album is a winner but musically the album does not succeed, but he "cannot in good conscience call the total project her best work to date, but there are still a handful of songs on Woven & Spun that firmly establish Nichole Nordeman as one of Christian music's strongest songwriters." Founder Tony Cummings at Cross Rhythms noting "Nichole's poignant and haunting songs a pristine pop sheen" on an album that he calls "Wonderful stuff." At Jesus Freak Hideout, founder John DiBiase saying that "Woven & Spun is a solid album and shows abundant growth in this artist's budding career." The Phantom Tollbooth's Josh Hurst stating that the album features a "cliche sound", yet notes Nordeman as being "one of the most inventive, honest, and profound lyricists writing today, and her remarkable pen has created an uplifting and worshipful testament to God's goodness with Woven and Spun." Allmusic contains a "mix of worship music and pop smarts."

Track listing

Personnel 

 Nichole Norderman – vocals, acoustic piano (2, 4)
 Mark Hammond – programming (1, 3, 7, 9, 12), drums (3, 7, 9, 12), string arrangements (3, 9)
 Tim Lauer – keyboards (2, 8)
 Charlie Peacock – keyboards (2, 8), string arrangements (5, 11), acoustic piano (6, 11), backing vocals (6)
 David Larring – programming (4, 6), mandolin (4), percussion (4), keyboards (6)
 Pat Coil – acoustic piano (5)
 Jay Joyce – electric guitar (1, 3)
 Bobby Terry – acoustic guitar (1)
 Scott Denté – acoustic guitar (2)
 Kenny Greenberg – guitars (2, 4, 6, 8)
 Jerry McPherson – guitars (2, 4, 8, 11)
 Gary Burnette – electric guitar (3, 7, 12)
 Brent Milligan – electric guitar (7), acoustic guitar (7), bass (11)
 George Cocchini – electric guitar (9)
 Sam Ashworth – guitars (11)
 Craig Young – bass (1)
 Mark Hill – bass (2, 4, 6, 8)
 Brad O'Donnell – bass (3, 7)
 John Hammond – drums (1)
 Scott Williamson – drums (2, 4, 6, 8)
 Matt Chamberlain – drums (11)
 Ken Lewis – percussion (2, 4, 8, 11)
 Danny O'Lannerghty – orchestration (3, 9), upright bass (12)
 David Davidson – string contractor (3, 9), violin (5, 11)
 The Love Sponge Strings – strings (3, 9)
 John Catchings – cello (5, 11)
 David Angell – violin (5, 11)
 Monisa Angell – violin (5, 11)
 Nirva Dorsaint – backing vocals (2, 11)
 Bebo Norman – backing vocals (2, 11)

Production

 Mark Hammond – producer at The Bennett House and Dark Horse Recording, Franklin, Tennessee, The Rec Room, Franklin, Tennessee, Sixteenth Avenue Sound, Nashville, Tennessee, Blair's House, Nashville, Tennessee (1, 3, 7, 9, 12)
 Charlie Peacock – producer at The Sound Kitchen,Franklin, Tennessee and The Art House, Nashville, Tennessee (2, 4–6, 8, 10, 11)
 Brad O'Donnell – executive producer
 F. Reid Shippen – recording (1, 3, 7, 9, 12)
 Bill Deaton – recording (2, 6, 8)
 Sam Ashworth – recording (4, 10, 11)
 Richie Biggs – recording (4, 5, 10, 11), overdub recording 
 Jacquire King – recording (4, 10, 11)
 Drew Bollman – recording assistant (2, 6, 8)
 Luke Vogel – recording assistant (5)
 Blair Masters – additional recording  (1, 3, 7, 9, 12)
 Russ Long – additional recording (1, 3, 7, 9, 12)
 Todd Robbins – additional recording (1, 3, 7, 9, 12)
 Matt Stanfield – additional recording, editing  (2, 4–6, 8, 10, 11)
 Dave Dillbeck – Pro Tools recording and editing  (1, 3, 7, 9, 12)
 Bridgett Evans O'Lannerghty – production manager (1, 3, 7, 9, 12)
 Tom Laune – mixing at Bridgeway Studios, Nashville, Tennessee (1, 3, 7, 9, 12) and Pentavarit and Bridgeway Studios(4, 5, 10, 11)
 Shane D. Wilson – mixing at Pentavarit and Bridgeway Studios, Nashville, Tennessee (2, 6, 8)
 Stephen Lotz – mix assistant (1, 3–5, 7, 9–12)
 Lee Broadwell – mix assistant (2, 6, 8)
 Bob Ludwig – mastering at Gateway Mastering (Portland, Maine)
 Jan Cook – art direction 
 Travis Gray – design 
 Matthew Barnes – photography 
 Sheila Davis – hair, make-up 
 Jennifer Kemp – stylist

External links

2002 albums
Nichole Nordeman albums